Dexithea fabricii is a species of beetle in the family Cerambycidae. It was described by Chevrolat in 1860.

References

Clytini
Beetles described in 1860